Copelatus racenisi is a species of diving beetle. It is part of the genus Copelatus in the subfamily Copelatinae of the family Dytiscidae. It was described by Félix Guignot in 1951.

References

racenisi
Beetles described in 1951